De Regt is a Dutch surname meaning "the righteous, the just".  Notable people with this name are:

 Ferry de Regt (b. 1988), Dutch footballer 
 Rutger de Regt (b. 1979), Dutch designer. 

Dutch-language surnames